Bound Brook is a borough in Somerset County, in the U.S. state of New Jersey, located along the Raritan River. As of the 2020 United States census, the borough's population was 11,988, an increase of 1,586 (+15.2%) from the 2010 census count of 10,402, which in turn reflected an increase of 247 (+2.4%) from the 10,155 counted in the 2000 census, .

Bound Brook was originally incorporated as a town by an act of the New Jersey Legislature on March 24, 1869, within portions of Bridgewater Township. On February 11, 1891, it was reincorporated as a borough, based on the results of a referendum held on the previous day.

History
The area was first settled in 1681 and a community was established near the Bound Brook stream of the same name, which flows into the Raritan River via the Green Brook on the eastern side of the borough. The brook, which was mentioned as a boundary in a Native American deed, provides the source of the borough's name.

A wooden bridge over the Raritan River was erected as early as 1761 and named Queen's Bridge in 1767. Later, it became a covered bridge. During the American Revolutionary War, the bridge was used repeatedly by both sides including during the Battle of Bound Brook in 1777. In 1875, the wooden bridge was replaced by a steel pipe truss bridge. More than 100 years later, that bridge was itself replaced by a steel girder bridge in 1984, still using the old pillars. The bridge was renovated and repaved in 2007.

The Battle of Bound Brook, one of the battles in the New York and New Jersey campaign during the American Revolutionary War, occurred on April 13, 1777, and resulted in a defeat for the Continental Army, who were routed by about 4,000 troops under British command.

On April 22, 1921, over 100 people were injured in Bound Brook, and one died, when a cloud of phosgene gas began spreading over the city in the early morning hours, the result of a faulty valve of a storage tank at a paint factory in town. The intervention of four people stopped further escape of the phosgene, which had been used in concentrated form as a chemical weapon during World War I.

Geography
According to the United States Census Bureau, the borough had a total area of 1.70 square miles (4.39 km2), including 1.66 square miles (4.30 km2) of land and 0.03 square miles (0.09 km2) of water (2.00%).

The borough borders the municipalities of Bridgewater Township and South Bound Brook in Somerset County; and Middlesex Borough in Middlesex County.

Since the southern portion of the borough (including the downtown area) is a low-lying natural flood plain of the Raritan River, Bound Brook has suffered occasional severe flooding after heavy rain. Extensive flood control measures were put into place during 1999–2015 to provide protection from 150-year floods.

Demographics

2010 census

The Census Bureau's 2006–2010 American Community Survey showed that (in 2010 inflation-adjusted dollars) median household income was $67,056 (with a margin of error of +/− $6,450) and the median family income was $68,315 (+/− $7,489). Males had a median income of $33,462 (+/− $4,681) versus $35,261 (+/− $7,245) for females. The per capita income for the borough was $25,015 (+/− $2,011). About 3.4% of families and 3.9% of the population were below the poverty line, including 6.0% of those under age 18 and 2.5% of those age 65 or over.

The borough had one of the highest Costa Rican percentages of any municipality in the United States and third-highest in New Jersey (population 500+), with 3.4% of residents in the 2010 Census reporting that they were of Costa Rican birth.

2000 census
At the 2000 United States census there were 10,155 people, 3,615 households and 2,461 families residing in the borough. The population density was 5,953.7 per square mile (2,292.9/km2). There were 3,802 housing units at an average density of 2,229.0 per square mile (858.5/km2). The racial makeup of the borough was 82.57% White, 2.52% African American, 0.31% Native American, 2.88% Asian, 0.07% Pacific Islander, 8.67% from other races, and 2.99% from two or more races. Hispanic or Latino of any race were 34.87% of the population.

There were 3,615 households, of which 31.0% had children under the age of 18 living with them, 49.1% were married couples living together, 11.9% had a female householder with no husband present, and 31.9% were non-families. 23.1% of all households were made up of individuals, and 9.2% had someone living alone who was 65 years of age or older. The average household size was 2.81 and the average family size was 3.21.

21.7% of the population were under the age of 18, 10.6% from 18 to 24, 36.2% from 25 to 44, 18.9% from 45 to 64, and 12.5% who were 65 years of age or older. The median age was 34 years. For every 100 females, there were 107.1 males. For every 100 females age 18 and over, there were 106.7 males.

The median household income was $46,858 and the median family income was $51,346. Males had a median income of $32,226 versus $28,192 for females. The per capita income for the borough was $22,395. About 6.9% of families and 10.9% of the population were below the poverty line, including 13.8% of those under age 18 and 5.2% of those age 65 or over.

The borough had the highest Costa Rican percentage of any municipality in the United States (population 500+), with 14.7% of residents in the 2000 Census reporting that they were of Costa Rican birth.

Parks and recreation
The borough has developed a series of trails for bicyclists and pedestrians that runs along the Raritan River, with a mix of paved and dirt trails providing access to residents.

Government

Local government
Bound Brook is governed under the Borough form of New Jersey municipal government, which is used in 218 municipalities (of the 564) statewide, making it the most common form of government in New Jersey. 

The governing body is comprised of a Mayor and a Borough Council comprising six members, with all positions elected at-large on a partisan basis as part of the November general election. A Mayor is elected directly by the voters to a four-year term of office. The Borough Council is comprised of six members elected to serve three-year terms on a staggered basis, with two seats coming up for election each year in a three-year cycle. 

The Borough form of government used by Bound Brook is a "weak mayor / strong council" government in which council members act as the legislative body with the mayor presiding at meetings and voting only in the event of a tie. The mayor can veto ordinances subject to an override by a two-thirds majority vote of the council. The mayor makes committee and liaison assignments for council members, and most appointments are made by the mayor with the advice and consent of the council.

, the mayor of Bound Brook is Republican David Morris, who was appointed to serve the balance of an unexpired term of office ending December 31, 2023. Members of the Borough Council are Linda Brnicevic (R, 2025), Abel Gomez (D, 2023), Dominic Longo (R, 2024), Kendall Lopez (D, 2025), Vinnie Petti (D, 2024) and Anthony Pranzatelli (D, 2023).

In September 2022, the Borough Council selected David Morris from a list of three candidates nominated by the Republican municipal committee to fill the mayoral seat expiring in December 2023 that became vacant after the resignation of Robert P. Fazen, who was moving out of the borough.

Federal, state and county representation
Bound Brook is located in the 12th Congressional District and is part of New Jersey's 23rd state legislative district. Prior to the 2011 reapportionment following the 2010 Census, Bound Brook had been in the 16th state legislative district. 

 

Somerset County is governed by a five-member Board of County Commissioners, whose members are elected at-large to three-year terms of office on a staggered basis, with one or two seats coming up for election each year. At an annual reorganization meeting held on the first Friday of January, the board selects a Director and Deputy Director from among its members. , Somerset County's County Commissioners are
Director Shanel Robinson (D, Franklin Township, term as commissioner ends December 31, 2024; term as director ends 2022),
Deputy Director Melonie Marano (D, Green Brook Township, term as commissioner and as deputy director ends 2022),
Paul Drake (D, Hillsborough Township, 2023),
Douglas Singleterry (D, North Plainfield, 2023) and 
Sara Sooy (D, Basking Ridge in Bernards Township, 2024).
Pursuant to Article VII Section II of the New Jersey State Constitution, each county in New Jersey is required to have three elected administrative officials known as constitutional officers. These officers are the County Clerk and County Surrogate (both elected for five-year terms of office) and the County Sheriff (elected for a three-year term). Constitutional officers, elected on a countywide basis are 
County Clerk Steve Peter (D, Somerville, 2022),
Sheriff Darrin Russo (D, Franklin Township, 2022) and 
Surrogate Bernice "Tina" Jalloh (D, Franklin Township, 2025)

Politics
As of March 2011, there were a total of 4,162 registered voters in Bound Brook, of which 1,149 (27.6% vs. 26.0% countywide) were registered as Democrats, 955 (22.9% vs. 25.7%) were registered as Republicans and 2,050 (49.3% vs. 48.2%) were registered as Unaffiliated. There were 8 voters registered as Libertarians or Greens. Among the borough's 2010 Census population, 40.0% (vs. 60.4% in Somerset County) of the total population were registered to vote, including 51.7% of those ages 18 and over (vs. 80.4% countywide).

In the 2012 presidential election, Democrat Barack Obama received 57.9% of the vote (1,598 cast), ahead of Republican Mitt Romney with 40.6% (1,120 votes), and other candidates with 1.6% (44 votes), among the 2,785 ballots cast by the borough's 4,399 registered voters (23 ballots were spoiled), for a turnout of 63.3%. 

In the 2008 presidential election, Democrat Barack Obama received 1,593 votes (53.5% vs. 52.1% countywide), ahead of Republican John McCain with 1,312 votes (44.0% vs. 46.1%) and other candidates with 45 votes (1.5% vs. 1.1%), among the 2,979 ballots cast by the borough's 3,990 registered voters, for a turnout of 74.7% (vs. 78.7% in Somerset County). In the 2004 presidential election, Democrat John Kerry received 1,474 votes (49.6% vs. 47.2% countywide), ahead of Republican George W. Bush with 1,440 votes (48.5% vs. 51.5%) and other candidates with 25 votes (0.8% vs. 0.9%), among the 2,970 ballots cast by the borough's 3,882 registered voters, for a turnout of 76.5% (vs. 81.7% in the whole county).

In the 2013 gubernatorial election, Republican Chris Christie received 64.5% of the vote (1,092 cast), ahead of Democrat Barbara Buono with 33.7% (570 votes), and other candidates with 1.8% (30 votes), among the 1,723 ballots cast by the borough's 4,485 registered voters (31 ballots were spoiled), for a turnout of 38.4%. 

In the 2009 gubernatorial election, Republican Chris Christie received 1,074 votes (52.2% vs. 55.8% countywide), ahead of Democrat Jon Corzine with 749 votes (36.4% vs. 34.1%), Independent Chris Daggett with 172 votes (8.4% vs. 8.7%) and other candidates with 32 votes (1.6% vs. 0.7%), among the 2,056 ballots cast by the borough's 4,138 registered voters, yielding a 49.7% turnout (vs. 52.5% in the county).

Education
The Bound Brook School District serves students in pre-kindergarten through twelfth grade. As of the 2020–21 school year, the district, comprised of five schools, had an enrollment of 1,975 students and 172.0 classroom teachers (on an FTE basis), for a student–teacher ratio of 11.5:1. Schools in the district (with 2020–21 enrollment data from the National Center for Education Statistics) are 
LaMonte-Annex Elementary School with 195 students in grades PreK-Kindergarten
Lafayette Elementary School with 266 students in grades 1-2, 
Smalley Elementary School with 545 students in grades 3-6, 
Community Middle School with 283 students in grades 7-8 and 
Bound Brook High School with 652 students in grades 9-12.

Students from South Bound Brook, New Jersey, attend the district's high school as part of a sending/receiving relationship with the South Bound Brook School District. At the start of the 2011–12 school year, the school joined the Interdistrict Public School Choice Program, which allows students from other area communities to attend the Bound Brook schools. In the 2011–2012 school year, the high school started a biomedical program from Project Lead the Way in addition to the existing engineering academy program.

There was an Interparochial Catholic School in the borough, Holy Family Academy (for Pre-K to grade 8) serving the local and surrounding communities with an estimated enrollment of 150 prior to closure. The school was one of three in the area closed by the Roman Catholic Diocese of Metuchen at the end of the 2010–2011 school year, with plans to feed remaining students to a school facility in South Plainfield.

In 2018, Stephen Kovacs founded and thereafter owned Kaprica United Fencing Academy in Bound Brook, where he was head coach.  

Kovacs was accused in 2021 by detectives of allegedly sexually assaulting two teenage fencing students multiple times in 2020 and 2021; he died in Somerset County Jail in January 2022.

Transportation

Roads and highways

Route 28 travels east–west through the center of Bound Brook, while U.S. Route 22 clips the northern portion of the borough. County Routes 525, 527, 533 also pass through.

Interstate 287 is accessible to the west via Route 28 in bordering Bridgewater Township.

Public transportation
The borough is served by the Bound Brook train station, which offers NJ Transit service on the Raritan Valley Line to Newark Penn Station. The historic station building on the north side of the tracks is located at 350 E. Main Street and was constructed in 1913. It is now a restaurant; the other station building on the south side is now privately owned. A pedestrian tunnel connects the south and north sides of the tracks. There are also Conrail tracks going past the station, used for freight trains to and from Newark.

NJ Transit offers bus service to and from the Port Authority Bus Terminal in Midtown Manhattan on the 114 and 117 routes, along with local service to Newark on the 65 and 66 routes.

Somerset County offers DASH, CAT, and SCOOT routes, providing service to destinations including Franklin Township, New Brunswick, Raritan, Manville and Hillsborough Township, as well as Bridgewater Commons and Raritan Valley Community College.

Bound Brook Cycling Classic
Every year, the Borough of Bound Brook hosts a nationally competitive bicycle race, the Bound Brook Cycling Classic, that on the same weekend, precedes the neighboring final purse contest, as part of the 3-day Tour of Somerville, held annually on Memorial Day Weekend. The contest in Somerville, founded in 1940 by Fred “Pop” Kugler, is the oldest professionally competitive race in the United States.

Natural disasters

The lower downtown area of Bound Brook has been infamous for flooding of the Raritan River. In September 1999, many structures near the commercial zone were damaged or destroyed by record Raritan floods resulting from Hurricane Floyd. This disaster reinvigorated a long-planned effort called the Green Brook Flood Control Project that would protect Bound Brook from up to a 150-year flooding event from the Raritan River and its tributaries, the Middle Brook and Green Brook that form the western and eastern boundaries of the town. During 1999–2015, the United States Army Corps of Engineers implemented extensive flood control measures to provide protection from future floods.

The highest flooding level since 1800 in Bound Brook was reached during Hurricane Floyd in September 1999 – , according to the United States Geological Survey—nearly matched by Tropical Storm Doria in August 1971, the April 2007 nor'easter and Hurricane Irene in August 2011. Main Street was also flooded in July 1938, September 1938, August 1955, August 1973, October 1996, and March 2010.

Bound Brook's downtown flooding led to several out-of-control fires over its history, including the fires of 1881 and 1887, which led to the formation of the Bound Brook Fire Department. In 1896, flooding likely caused the lime in the L.D. Cook lumberyard to ignite and the resulting fire spread to and destroyed the Presbyterian church. During Hurricane Floyd in 1999, a fire began in Otto Williams Harley Davidson on Main Street. With the building cut off by flood water, the fire spread quickly to two other structures before the Bound Brook Fire Department could contain it, then under the command of Chief Richard S. Colombaroni. Using fire boats from the New York City Fire Department as well as extensive help from mutual aid companies, the fire was stopped before two other buildings on Main Street and others nearby on Mountain Avenue, could be affected.

During the April 2007 Nor'easter, the Bound Brook Fire Department stopped another fire from spreading through an area of close residential construction. Under the command of Chief James Knight, and again with the assistance of mutual aid companies including the Finderne Fire Department, fire loss was restricted to three residential buildings.

On January 12, 2020, a non flood-related, seven-alarm fire set by an arsonist ripped through commercial buildings in the downtown area, causing $52 million in damages.

Notable people

People who were born in, residents of, or otherwise closely associated with Bound Brook include:

 Isaac Blackford (1786–1859), Indiana Supreme Court Justice
 Margaret Bourke-White (1904–1971), photographer
 Jeffrey Chiesa (born 1965), 59th Attorney General of New Jersey and interim United States Senator from New Jersey
 John G. Demaray (1930–2015), medievalist
 Margit Feldman (1929–2020), public speaker, educator, activist, and Holocaust survivor
 Patrick X. Gallagher (1935–2019), mathematician and Columbia University professor
 William P. Gottlieb (1917–2006), jazz musician and photographer
 Sylvester Graham (1794–1851), Presbyterian minister and inventor of the Graham cracker
 William Griffith (1766–1826), judge who served on the United States circuit court
 William H. Johnson (stage name Zip the Pinhead; 1857–1926), freak show and circus performer
 George M. La Monte (1863–1927), businessman, politician, and philanthropist
 Dick Lynch (1936–2008), NFL defensive back who played for the Washington Redskins and the New York Giants
 James Augustine McFaul (1850–1917), Bishop of the Roman Catholic Diocese of Trenton from 1894 to 1917
 Ronald Naldi, singer at the Metropolitan Opera   
 William E. Ozzard (1915–2002), President of the New Jersey Senate and the New Jersey Board of Public Utilities.
 George Pfister (1918–1997), Major League Baseball executive 
 Jason Ryan (born 1976), MLB pitcher who played for the Minnesota Twins
 Upton Sinclair (1878–1968), muckraker-writer
 Samuel Swan (1771–1844), physician and U.S. Congressman
 Henry Trefflich (1908–1978), wild animal importer and dealer
 Perry Wilson (1916–2009), actress who appeared in the film Fear Strikes Out

See also 
 Brook Industrial Park Superfund Site

References

External links

 Official Bound Brook Website
 Somerset County directory for Bound Brook
 Bound Brook School District
 
 School Data for the Bound Brook School District, National Center for Education Statistics
 Unofficial Bound Brook Message Board
 Bound Brook portal
 Raritan River Gauge, Bound Brook, New Jersey – Observation gauge approximately 1.2 miles southwest (upstream) of Bound Brook, NJ, just below Calco Dam.  Main Street in Bound Brook floods when the river reaches a 30-foot stage.
 Unofficial Bound Brook News site
 Bound Brook Office of Emergency Management website
 Bound Brook High School Alumni Association and Hall of Fame 

 
1891 establishments in New Jersey
Borough form of New Jersey government
Boroughs in Somerset County, New Jersey
Costa Rican-American culture
Populated places established in 1891